Zhongxing may refer to:

Mainland China
 Zhongxing Prefecture, capital of Western Xia dynasty
 ZTE, or Zhong Xing Telecommunication Equipment Company Limited, a telecommunications equipment corporation
 ZX Auto, automobile manufacturer whose full name is Hebei Zhongxing Automobile
 Chinasat, a family of communications satellites whose phonetic translation is Zhongxing
 Chinasat-9 (Zhongxing-9)

Towns
 Zhongxing, Anhui, Shou County (众兴镇)
 Zhongxing, Jiangsu, Siyang County (众兴镇)
 Zhongxing, Shan County, Shandong (终兴镇)
 Zhongxing, Shanghai, Chongming District (中兴镇)

Taiwan
 Zhongxing Guesthouse (中興賓館), historical site in Taipei
 Zhongxing New Village (中興新村), in Nantou County, seat of Taiwan Province, Republic of China
 National Chung Hsing University, a university in Taichung

Historical eras
Zhongxing (386–394), era name used by Murong Yong, emperor of Western Yan
Zhongxing (501–502), era name used by Emperor He of Southern Qi
Zhongxing (531–532), era name used by Yuan Lang, emperor of Northern Wei
Zhongxing (794) or Jungheung, era name used by Seong of Balhae
Zhongxing (958), era name used by Li Jing (Southern Tang)

See also
Zhong Xing (1574–1625), Ming dynasty scholar and poet